This is a list of ice hockey games with the highest attendance on record. All of the games on this list were held in stadiums designed for field sports such as association football, gridiron football, and baseball. Four of the "games" listed were actually doubleheaders, in which a single ticket provided admission to two games held back-to-back. The fixed-roof Ford Field in Detroit hosted one doubleheader and a single game, and another was held at the retractable-roof Veltins-Arena in Gelsenkirchen, Germany (with the roof closed for that game); all other games on the list were held in open-air venues. Most of these games were staged as special events, and all but one were played in the 21st century.

Attendance in the 30,000 range was once quite common for major international matches held outdoors in the 1940s and 50s in Moscow's Lenin Stadium. Figures of this type are still common in bandy, a relative of ice hockey played outdoors.

The record for a Stanley Cup playoff game, as well as for an NHL game played in a teams' regular home stadium, is 28,183, which was set on April 23, 1996, at the Thunderdome during a Tampa Bay Lightning – Philadelphia Flyers game.

A new record was set on December 11, 2010, when the University of Michigan's men's ice hockey team faced cross-state rival Michigan State in an event billed as "The Big Chill at the Big House". The game was played at Michigan's football venue, Michigan Stadium in Ann Arbor, with a capacity of 109,901, as of the 2010 football season. Ultimately, a crowd announced by the University of Michigan as 113,411, at that time the largest in the stadium's history (including football), saw the homestanding Wolverines win 5–0. Guinness World Records, using a count of ticketed fans who actually entered the stadium instead of UM's figure of tickets sold, announced a final figure of 104,173.

Image gallery

See also
List of outdoor ice hockey games

References 

Attendance
 
Attendance
Ice hockey